Acta Ophthalmologica is a peer-reviewed academic, medical journal of ophthalmology established in 1923. The journal is edited by Kai Kaarniranta (University of Eastern Finland) and Einar Stefánsson (University of Iceland) and is published 8 times per year by John Wiley & Sons on behalf of the Acta Ophthalmologica Scandinavica Foundation. It is the official journal of the five Nordic Ophthalmological Societies as well as of the European Association for Vision and Eye Research (since 2006) and the Dutch Ophthalmological Society. Supplement issues, as well special issues for doctoral theses, are published along with the main journal.

History
The journal was established in 1923 as Acta Ophthalmologica and published bimonthly. It was renamed in 1995 as Acta Ophthalmologica Scandinavica (print: ,) and returned to its original title in 2008, when the publication frequency was increased to 8 per year.

A supplement to the journal has also been published. From 1932 to 1984 this was entitled Acta Ophthalmologica Supplementum and from 1985 to 1994 Acta Ophthalmologica Supplement. From 1995 to 2007, it was published as Acta Ophthalmologica Scandinavica Supplement, before returning to Acta Ophthalmologica Supplement (print: ,) in 2008.

Prizes

The Acta Ophthalmologica Award is given biennially in recognition of excellence in ophthalmic research to a scientist from the Nordic countries, selected by the Board of Directors of the Acta Ophthalmologica Scandinavica Foundation. It is handed out at the Nordic Congress of Ophthalmology and was initiated in 2002. The Award involves the right to give the Acta Honorary Lecture, and the recipient receives a gold medal that depicts the two skating owls associated with Acta Ophthalmologica. No award was given in 2020 because the Nordic Congress was postponed to 2022.

The Acta-EVER Award is given annually in recognition of achievements in eye and vision research to a scientist selected alternately by the Board of Directors of the Acta Ophthalmologica Scandinavica Foundation and the Board of the European Association for Vision and Eye Research. It is handed out at the Congress of this Association and was initiated in 2006. The Award involves the right to give the Acta-EVER Honorary Lecture, and the recipient receives a silver medal that depicts professor Conrad Christian Carl Lundsgaard, the founder of Acta Ophthalmologica. No award was given in 2020 and 2021 because the Congress was changed to virtual.

Abstracting and indexing 
The journal is indexed and abstracted in the following databases:

According to the Journal Citation Reports, the journal has a 2020 impact factor of 3.761, ranking it 13th out of 62 journals in the category "Ophthalmology".

References

External links 
 

English-language journals
Wiley (publisher) academic journals
Ophthalmology journals
Publications established in 1923
Hybrid open access journals
8 times per year journals